Planilaoma luckmanii is a species of small air-breathing land snails, terrestrial pulmonate gastropod mollusks in the family Charopidae. This species is endemic to Australia.

References

Gastropods of Australia
Planilaoma
Gastropods described in 1877
Taxonomy articles created by Polbot